During World War II, Operation Foxley was a 1944 plan to assassinate Adolf Hitler, conceived by the British Special Operations Executive (SOE). Although detailed preparations were made, no attempt was made to carry out the plan. Historians believe the most likely date for an attempt would have been 13–14 July 1944, during one of Hitler's visits to the Berghof.

Prior plans
One of the first actual British plans to assassinate Hitler was to bomb the special train "Amerika" (in 1943 renamed "Brandenburg") he travelled in; SOE had extensive experience of derailing trains using explosives. The plan was dropped because Hitler's schedule was too irregular and unpredictable: stations were informed of his arrival only a few minutes beforehand. 

Another plan was to put some tasteless but lethal poison in the drinking water supply on Hitler's train. However, this plan was considered too complicated because of the need for an inside man.

Plan

Ultimately a sniper attack was considered to be the method most likely to succeed. In Summer 1944, a German who had been part of Hitler's personal guard at the Berghof had been taken prisoner in Normandy. He revealed that at the Berghof, Hitler always took a 20-minute morning walk at around the same time (after 10:00). Hitler liked to be left alone during this walk, leaving him unprotected near some woods, where he was out of sight of sentry posts. When Hitler was at the Berghof, a Nazi flag visible from a cafe in the nearby town was flown. 

The plan was to assassinate Hitler during his morning exercise, as he walked unprotected to the Teehaus on Mooslahnerkopf Hill from the Berghof residence. The scheme called for the SOE to parachute a German-speaking Pole and a British sniper into Austria. An "inside man" was recruited, the uncle of a prisoner of war named Dieser, who was a shopkeeper living in nearby (20 km) Salzburg, identified as "Heidentaler", who was vehemently anti-Nazi. Heidentaler would shelter the agents and transport them to Berchtesgaden disguised as German mountain troops (Gebirgsjäger), from where they would make the approach to the vantage point for the attack.

A sniper was recruited and briefed, and the plan was submitted. The sniper practised by firing at moving dummy targets with an accurized Kar 98k with a Mauser telescopic sight, the standard rifle of the Wehrmacht, under conditions that simulated the planned attack. Additionally, a 9mm parabellum Luger pistol fitted with a British-made silencer was provided so that the sniper could quietly deal with any threats while approaching the target. The Luger is now on display at the Combined Military Services Museum in Maldon, Essex.

There was some opposition to the assassination plan among the British authorities, particularly from the Deputy Head of SOE's German Directorate, Lt. Col. Ronald Thornley. However, his superior, Sir Gerald Templer, and British Prime Minister Winston Churchill supported it. 

The proposal for the operation was submitted in November 1944, but was never authorised due to a division within the British government as to whether Hitler's removal was a sound way to expedite victory. By then, he was considered by the British to be such a poor strategist that it was thought possible that candidates who would be in line to succeed him might present more of a challenge to the Allied war effort. Thornley also argued that Germany was almost defeated, and if Hitler was assassinated, he would become a martyr figure to some Germans and possibly give rise to a myth that Germany might have been victorious if he had not been killed by underhand means, leading to the threat of more wars with Germany in the future. As the Allied war aims had become not merely the military defeat of the Third Reich, but to destroy the National Socialist political ideology in Central Europe in general, this rendered the proposed operation potentially undesirable. The debate in the British government divided opinion, and so the operation was not authorised. Its approval was also undermined by a lack of reliable intelligence as to Hitler's daily routine at the Berghof to give the attack team a reasonable chance of success.

Hitler left the Berghof for the last time on 14 July 1944, never to return; six days later, anti-Nazi Wehrmacht officers attempted to assassinate him as part of the July 20 plot.

See also
 Assassination attempts on Adolf Hitler
 Rogue Male, a prewar novel about a British private citizen making such an assassination attempt prior to the start of the World War II
 Killing Hitler, a BBC docudrama
 The Day of the Jackal
 Bombing of Obersalzberg

References

Further reading

External links
 Hitler assassination plan – Classroom resource at The National Archives (United Kingdom).
 Operation Foxley: Mission: Liquidate Hitler – Documentary on YouTube.

Operation Foxley
Cancelled military operations involving the United Kingdom
Operations involving British special forces
Special Operations Executive operations
Military operations of World War II involving Germany
United Kingdom intelligence operations
Cancelled military operations of World War II
Cancelled special forces operations